{{DISPLAYTITLE:C12H8N2}}
The molecular formula C12H8N2 (molar mass: 180.21 g/mol, exact mass: 180.0687 u) may refer to:

 Benzo[c]cinnoline
 Phenanthroline
 Phenazine